Spring Villa is a historic Carpenter Gothic plantation house on the outskirts of Opelika, Alabama.  Inspired by designs published by Andrew Jackson Downing, the house is one of only about twenty remaining residential examples of Gothic Revival architecture remaining in the state.  It was built by William Penn Yonge in 1850 next to a  spring-fed lake, from which it takes its name.

The house was acquired by the city of Opelika in 1927 and now forms the nucleus of its  Spring Villa Park.  It was added to the National Register of Historic Places on January 3, 1978, due to its architectural significance.

Architecture
The -story wood-frame building has a front elevation with three bays. The ridge-line of the roof is parallel to the front façade. Each side of the main structure is gabled and flanked by stuccoed chimneys.  The upper story makes extensive use of steeply pitched cross-gables. Each window on the upper floor is fronted by an individual sawnwork balcony. These originally incorporated latticework rather than the current simple balusters.  Each gable is trimmed with bargeboards and crowned with a diamond-shaped pinnacle.

The semi-detached, centrally placed rear ell, also one-and-a-half stories, has a four-bay façade on each long side and replicates features seen on the main façade.  It was added to the building in 1934 by the Civil Works Administration, during conversion of the house into a clubhouse for the city.

Alleged haunting

Adding to the charm of the plantation is the legend claiming that the mid-19th-century house is now haunted by the ghost of its builder, William Penn Yonge, a harsh master said to have angered his many slaves. The legend tells of the one slave who, seeking revenge for some undeserved punishment, hid one night in the niche located above the 13th step of the home's spiral staircase. It is said that the angry slave stabbed Yonge to death as he reached the 13th step, where a dark red stain believed to be the master's blood remained until its rotted wood was repaired many years later. Visitors touring the homestead are still warned to avoid stepping on this haunted spot.

References

External links
 

National Register of Historic Places in Lee County, Alabama
Houses on the National Register of Historic Places in Alabama
Carpenter Gothic architecture in Alabama
Gothic Revival architecture in Alabama
Houses completed in 1850
Houses in Lee County, Alabama
Carpenter Gothic houses in the United States
Historic American Buildings Survey in Alabama